Itza Kingdom may refer to:
Itza Kingdom (550-930)
Itza Kingdom (970-987)
Itza Under the League of Mayapan
Peten Itza Kingdom, the Itza kingdom based in northern Guatemala